The Block Signal is 1926 silent drama film directed by Frank O'Connor and starring Ralph Lewis, Jean Arthur and Hugh Allan. It was produced by the independent company Gotham Pictures.

Synopsis
A veteran railroad engineer discovers that his eyesight is failing and he is becoming colorblind. Bert Steele his fireman who craves promotion deliberately misleads him about a signal leading him to be demoted. Jealous and frustrated by his unrequited love for the engineer's daughter Grace, Steele considers a more direct form of sabotage.

Cast
Ralph Lewis as 'Jovial Joe' Ryan
Jean Arthur as Grace Ryan
Hugh Allan as Jack Milford
George Chesebro as Bert Steele 
Sidney Franklin as 'Roadhouse' Rosen
Leon Holmes as 'Unhandy' Andy
Missouri Royer as Jim Brennan

Preservation status
The picture is preserved at the UCLA Film and TV Archive and Academy Film Archive.

References

Bibliography
 Connelly, Robert B. The Silents: Silent Feature Films, 1910-36, Volume 40, Issue 2. December Press, 1998.
 Munden, Kenneth White. The American Film Institute Catalog of Motion Pictures Produced in the United States, Part 1. University of California Press, 1997.

External links
The Block Signal at IMDb.com

1926 films
American silent feature films
Films based on short fiction
Rail transport films
1926 drama films
American black-and-white films
Silent American drama films
Gotham Pictures films
Films directed by Frank O'Connor
1920s American films